Distance sampling is a widely used group of closely related methods for estimating the density and/or abundance of populations. The main methods are based on line transects or point transects. In this method of sampling, the data collected are the distances of the objects being surveyed from these randomly placed lines or points, and the objective is to estimate the average density of the objects within a region.

Basic line transect methodology
  

A common approach to distance sampling is the use of line transects. The observer traverses a straight line (placed randomly or following some planned distribution). Whenever they observe an object of interest (e.g., an animal of the type being surveyed), they record the distance from their current position to the object (r), as well as the angle of the detection to the transect line (θ). The distance of the object to the transect can then be calculated as x = r * sin(θ). These distances x are the detection distances that will be analyzed in further modeling. 

Objects are detected out to a pre-determined maximum detection distance w. Not all objects within w will be detected, but a fundamental assumption is that all objects at zero distance (i.e., on the line itself) are detected. Overall detection probability is thus expected to be 1 on the line, and to decrease with increasing distance from the line. The distribution of the observed distances is used to estimate a "detection function" that describes the probability of detecting an object at a given distance. Given that various basic assumptions hold, this function allows the estimation of the average probability P of detecting an object given that is within width w of the line.

In summary, modeling how detectability drops off with increasing distance from the transect allows estimating how many objects there are in total in the area of interest, based on the number that were actually observed.

The survey methodology for point transects is slightly different. In this case, the observer remains stationary, the survey ends not when the end of the transect is reached but after a pre-determined time, and measured distances to the observer are used directly without conversion to transverse distances. Detection function types and fitting are also different to some degree.

Detection function 

The drop-off of detectability with increasing distance from the transect line is modeled using a detection function g(y) (here y is distance from the line). This function is fitted to the distribution of detection ranges represented as a probability density function (PDF). The PDF is a histogram of collected distances and describes the probability that an object at distance y will be detected by an observer on the center line, with detections on the line itself (y = 0) assumed to be certain (P = 1).

By preference, g(y) is a robust function that can represent data with unclear or weakly defined distribution characteristics, as is frequently the case in field data. Several types of functions are commonly used, depending on the general shape of the detection data's PDF:

Here w is the overall detection truncation distance and a, b and σ are function-specific parameters. The half-normal and hazard-rate functions are generally considered to be most likely to represent field data that was collected under well-controlled conditions. Detection probability appearing to increase or remain constant with distance from the transect line may indicate problems with data collection or survey design.

Covariates

Series expansions
A frequently used method to improve the fit of the detection function to the data is the use of series expansions. Here, the function is split into a "key" part (of the type covered above) and a "series" part; i.e., g(y) = key(y)[1 + series(y)]. The series generally takes the form of a polynomial (e.g. a Hermite polynomial) and is intended to add flexibility to the form of the key function, allowing it to fit more closely to the data PDF. While this can improve the precision of density/abundance estimates, its use is only defensible if the data set is of sufficient size and quality to represent a reliable estimate of detection distance distribution. Otherwise there is a risk of overfitting the data and allowing non-representative characteristics of the data set to bias the fitting process.

Assumptions and sources of bias
Since distance sampling is a comparatively complex survey method, the reliability of model results depends on meeting a number of basic assumptions. The most fundamental ones are listed below. Data derived from surveys that violate one or more of these assumptions can frequently, but not always, be corrected to some extent before or during analysis.

Software implementations
A project group at the University of St Andrews maintains a suite of packages for use with R as well as a standalone program for Windows.

References

Further reading
 El-Shaarawi (ed) 'Encyclopedia of Environmetrics', Wiley-Blackwell, 2012 , six volume set.

External links 
 Bibliography of > 1400 scientific publications using the method

Environmental statistics
Demography
Sampling techniques